Lee Hye-young (born 30 July 1982) is a South Korean taekwondo practitioner. 

She won a gold medal in flyweight at the 2001 World Taekwondo Championships in Jeju City, and a bronze medal in bantamweight at the 2011 World Taekwondo Championships in Gyeongju. She won a gold meda at the 2006  Asian Taekwondo Championships in Bangkok.

References

External links

1982 births
Living people
South Korean female taekwondo practitioners
World Taekwondo Championships medalists
Asian Taekwondo Championships medalists
21st-century South Korean women